The Courier of Moncenisio is a 1954 Italian historical melodrama film directed by Guido Brignone and starring Roldano Lupi, Virna Lisi and Arnoldo Foà. It is the last of three film adaptation of the 1852 novel Jean le Coucher by Jean Bouchardy.

Plot 
Nineteenth century. A woman, believing she has been widowed by her carrier husband, remarries a noble. He is actually plotting to get hold of a large inheritance, but he gets caught and kills himself. At this point, the woman's first husband, believed dead, reappears and rejoins the family.

Cast

References

External links 
 
 The Cuorier of Moncenisio at Variety Distribution

1954 films
Italian historical drama films
1950s historical drama films
1950s Italian-language films
Films directed by Guido Brignone
Remakes of Italian films
Sound film remakes of silent films
1954 drama films
Melodrama films
Italian black-and-white films
1950s Italian films